Cabo de Hornos (Cape Horn) is a Chilean commune located in the south of Tierra del Fuego archipelago, in Antártica Province, Magallanes Region. The municipality of Cabo de Hornos, located in the town of Puerto Williams, also administers the Antártica commune. It is named for Cabo de Hornos, or "Cape Horn", the southern tip of South America.

Demographics
Of these, 1,952 (86.3%) lived in urban areas and 310 (13.7%) in rural areas. The population grew by 24.7% (448 persons) between the 1992 and 2002 censuses.

Administration
As a commune, Cabo de Hornos is a third-level administrative division of Chile administered by a municipal council, headed by an alcalde who is directly elected every four years. The 2016-2020 alcalde is Patricio Fernández (PDC). The communal council has the following members:

Daniel Fernando Valdebenito Contreras (PS) Ángela Barría Barrientos (RN) Juan Velásquez (PS) Carolina Guenel González (DC) Francis Delgado Ibaceta (RN) Paola Speake Ojeda (DC)

Within the electoral divisions of Chile, Cabo de Hornos is represented in the Chamber of Deputies by Juan Morano (PDC) and Gabriel Boric (Ind.) as part of the 60th electoral district, which includes the entire Magallanes y la Antártica Chilena Region. The commune is represented in the Senate by Carlos Bianchi Chelech (Ind.) and Carolina Goic (PDC) as part of the 19th senatorial constituency (Magallanes y la Antártica Chilena Region).

See also
 Murray Channel

References

 Cabo de Hornos commune (Chile). 2006

External links
  Official website of the Municipality of Cabo de Hornos
Official website of Puerto Williams
Gobierno Regional Magallanes y Antártica Chilena Official website (in Spanish)
Cape Horn Biosphere Reserve

Communes of Chile
Populated places in Antártica Chilena